Legislative elections were held in France on 8 and 22 May 1898. The government of Jules Méline, who had been premier since April 1896, had relied on the support of Conservatives, contrary to the convention of republican concentration, according to which no government should rely on the support of monarchists and Bonapartists in the Chamber of Deputies if it could not rely on a republican majority.

The elections were dominated by the Dreyfus Affair, and saw several notable supporters of Dreyfus (Joseph Reinach, Jean Jaurès, Jules Guesde) lose their seats. Twenty-two professed anti-Semites were also elected, including Édouard Drumont. Overall, however, the election saw the defeat of Méline and his supporters: the Radicals were victorious, allowing Henri Brisson to form a republican government.

Results

References

External links
Map of Deputies elected in 1898 according to their group in the House, including overseas (in French)

Legislative elections in France
Legislative
France
France